Foreign Affaires is a 1935 British comedy film directed by and starring Tom Walls. It also features Ralph Lynn, Robertson Hare, Norma Varden and Cecil Parker. The screenplay is by Ben Travers, and the cast included cast members from the Walls and Travers Aldwych Farces.

Plot
The film is set on the French Riviera where two hard-living British spongers become mixed up in illegal gambling.

Cast
 Tom Walls as Captain Archibald Gore
 Ralph Lynn as Jefferson Darby
 Robertson Hare as Mr Hardy Hornett
 Norma Varden as Mrs Hardy Hornett
 Marie Lohr as Mrs Cope
 Diana Churchill as Sophie
 Cecil Parker as Lord Wormington
 Kathleen Kelly as Millicent
 Gordon James as Rope
 Ivor Barnard as Count
 Mervyn Johns as Courtroom interpreter
 Basil Radford as Basil Mallory
 Martita Hunt as Woman at Lord Wormington's house

References

1935 films
1935 comedy films
British comedy films
Aldwych farce
British black-and-white films
British films about gambling
Films set in England
Films set in London
Films set in Nice
Films scored by Jack Beaver
1930s English-language films
1930s British films